Dana Fecková (born 26 February 1987) is a Slovak footballer who plays as a striker for the Swiss club FC Neunkirch and the Slovakia national team.

She previously represented Slovan Bratislava in the Slovak First League and the UEFA Women's Champions League.

Career

National Team

International Cups

Matches 
Sources:

National Team

International Cups

References

1987 births
Living people
Women's association football forwards
Slovak women's footballers
Footballers from Bratislava
Slovakia women's international footballers
ŠK Slovan Bratislava (women) players
FC Neunkirch players
Slovak expatriate  footballers
Slovak expatriate sportspeople in Switzerland
Expatriate women's footballers in Switzerland